Gaines County is a county in the U.S. state of Texas. As of the 2020 census, its population was 21,598. The county seat is Seminole.

History
The county is named for James Gaines, a merchant who signed the Texas Declaration of Independence and was born in Culpeper County, Virginia in 1779. During the 19th century, the land had been occupied solely by Comanche and Mexican Comancheros, traders who had a thriving business with the Plains Indians. In October 1875, Lt. Bullis, who commanded the 24th Infantry Regiment, encountered a large group of Indians at Cedar Lake. Lt. Bullis captured them for food, supplies, utensils, and buffalo hides. It was then that Col. Shafter established a camp at Cedar Lake and continued to scout the area as far south as the Pecos River. That November he came across a draw where he found a water development. He discovered over 70 wells that reached levels 4 to 15 feet deep. This area became a regular place to trade goods.

In 1887 the northern part of the county was occupied by the Mallet Ranch. The foreman, Dave Ernest, sold the ranch to a merchant from San Antonio who used the land for driving cattle towards Kansas. On October 24, 1905, Gaines County became an organized county in Texas. Land was donated by non-resident landowners which would become the town of Seminole, Texas, the county seat. In 1912 a small post office opened up east of Seminole that was named after a local ranch brand that would later become Loop, Texas. In 1917 the Santa Fe Railroad came through Blythe, Texas, but its name was changed to Seagraves, Texas after the company discovered they had a town by the same name already located on the line.

A great addition to Gaines County came in 1977 when a group of Mennonites arrived to start farming and ranching. In 2005 Gaines County became the number one oil producing, cotton producing, and peanut producing county in Texas.

Geography

Major highways
  U.S. Highway 62
  U.S. Highway 180
  U.S. Highway 385
  State Highway 83
  State Highway 115
  State Highway 214

Adjacent counties
 Yoakum County (north)
 Terry County (north)
 Dawson County (east)
 Martin County (southeast)
 Andrews County (south)
 Lea County, New Mexico (west)

Demographics

Note: the US Census treats Hispanic/Latino as an ethnic category. This table excludes Latinos from the racial categories and assigns them to a separate category. Hispanics/Latinos can be of any race.

As of the 2020 United States census, there were 21,598 people, 5,812 households, and 4,545 families residing in the county.

As of the census of 2000, there were 14,467 people, 4,681 households, and 3,754 families residing in the county.  The population density was 10 people per square mile (4/km2).  There were 5,410 housing units at an average density of 4 per square mile (1/km2).  The racial makeup of the county was 80.28% White, 2.28% Black or African American, 0.76% Native American, 0.15% Asian, 0.01% Pacific Islander, 14.17% from other races, and 2.35% from two or more races.  35.77% of the population were Hispanic or Latino of any race.

There were 4,681 households, out of which 45.30% had children under the age of 18 living with them, 67.70% were married couples living together, 8.80% had a female householder with no husband present, and 19.80% were non-families. 18.20% of all households were made up of individuals, and 8.60% had someone living alone who was 65 years of age or older.  The average household size was 3.07 and the average family size was 3.53.

In the county, the population was spread out, with 35.00% under the age of 18, 9.50% from 18 to 24, 26.80% from 25 to 44, 18.40% from 45 to 64, and 10.30% who were 65 years of age or older.  The median age was 30 years. For every 100 females there were 97.00 males.  For every 100 females age 18 and over, there were 94.00 males.

The median income for a household in the county was $30,432, and the median income for a family was $34,046. Males had a median income of $29,580 versus $16,996 for females. The per capita income for the county was $13,088.  About 17.30% of families and 21.70% of the population were below the poverty line, including 29.20% of those under age 18 and 15.70% of those age 65 or over.

Media
The county is served by a twice-a-week newspaper publication, the Seminole Sentinel, as well as local radio stations KIKZ (AM) and KSEM-FM.

Communities

Cities
 Seagraves
 Seminole (county seat)

Town
 Denver City (mostly in Yoakum County)

Census-designated place
 Loop

Politics

Education
School districts serving Gaines County include:
 Loop Independent School District
 Seagraves Independent School District
 Seminole Independent School District
 Wellman-Union Consolidated Independent School District

Most of Gaines County is assigned to South Plains College's service area. The portion of the county in Seminole ISD is assigned to the Odessa College service area.

Notable people
 Larry Gatlin, country music singer
 Paul Patterson (author)
 Tanya Tucker, country music singer

See also

 Recorded Texas Historic Landmarks in Gaines County

References

External links
 Gaines County government's website
 
 Inventory of county records, Gaines County courthouse, Seminole, Texas, hosted by the Portal to Texas History
 Gaines County Profile from the Texas Association of Counties

 
1905 establishments in Texas
Populated places established in 1905